Cuisine is a bi-monthly food and wine magazine published in New Zealand. It began publication in 1986, and has also existed in website form since December 2000.

The magazine features recipes, restaurant reviews, wine reviews and travel features. Annual promotions includeCuisine Good Food Awards and the Cuisine Artisan Awards.

Cuisine has won multiple awards including best food magazine at the Gourmet Voice World Media Awards, and best food magazine at the Le Cordon Bleu Food Media Awards.

History
Cuisine was the first New Zealand magazine devoted to food and wine. It was started by Hamish Allison, then brought by Julie Dalzell in 1986. It was bought by Independent Newspapers Limited (INL) in 2001. INL sold all its publications to Fairfax Media in 2003, and they became part of Fairfax New Zealand. Cuisine was later bought by Slick & Sassy Media from Fairfax. Kelli Brett is the current editor.

Cuisine Restaurant of the Year awards
In 2004 Cuisine developed a New Zealand restaurant competition. The awards are now sponsored by Vittoria Coffee.

2011 Results
 Supreme Winner – Merediths
 Best Smart Dining Metropolitan – Merediths
 Runner-up – Ambeli
 Best Smart Dining Regional – Ả Deco
 Runner-up – Boutereys Restaurant & Bar
 Best Casual Dining Metropolitan – Arbitrageur
 Runner-up – Ponsonby Road Bistro
 Best Casual Dining Regional (first equal) – Palate and Riverstone Kitchen
 Best Specialist Restaurant – Cocoro
 Best Winery Restaurant (first equal) – Black Barn Bistro and Pegasus Bay
 Restaurant Personality – Jonny Schwass

2010 Results
 Supreme Winner – Riverstone Kitchen
 Best Smart Dining Metropolitan – The French Café
 Runner-up – Martin Bosley's
 Best Smart Dining Regional (first equal) – Ả Deco and Bouterey's at 251
 Best Casual Dining Metropolitan – Soul Bar & Bistro
 Runner-up – Ponsonby Road Bistro
 Best Casual Dining Regional – Riverstone Kitchen
 Runner-up – Palate
 Best Neighbourhood Restaurant – Ambeli
 Runner-up – Two Fifteen Bistro & Wine Bar
 Best Specialist Restaurant – O’Sarracino
 Runner-up – Ortega Fish Shack & Bar
 Best Winery Restaurant – Pegasus Bay Winery Restaurant
 Runner-up – Black Barn Bistro
 Restaurant Personality – Shae Moleta

2009 Results
 Supreme Winner – Logan Brown
 Best Smart Dining Metropolitan – Logan Brown
 Best Smart Dining Regional – Bouterey's at 251
 Best Casual Dining Metropolitan – Soul Bar & Bistro
 Best Casual Dining Regional – Hopgood's Restaurant & Bar
 Best Neighbourhood Restaurant – Molten
 Best Winery Restaurant – First equal – Terrôir at Craggy Range & Pegasus Bay

2008 Results
 Supreme Winner – Matterhorn
 Best Smart Dining Metropolitan – The French Cafe
 Best Casual Dining Regional – Wendy Campbell's French Bistro
 Best Winery Restaurant – Pegasus Bay
 Best Wine Experience – O’Connell Street Bistro

2007 Results
 Supreme Winner – Martin Bosley's
 Best Smart Dining – Martin Bosley's
 Best Casual Dining Metropolitan – Pravda Café
 Best Casual Dining Regional – The Martinborough at Peppers Martinbourough Hotel
 Best Winery Restaurant – Amisfield Winery Bistro
 Best Wine Experience – O’Connell Street

2006 Results
 Supreme Winner – The French Café
 Best Metropolitan – The French Café
 Runner-up (first equal) – Logan Brown and The Grove
 Best Provincial – The Bach
 Runner-up – Herzog Winery & Luxury Restaurant
 Best Winery – Amisfield Bistro
 Runner-up – Te Awa Winery & Restaurant

2005 Results
 Best Restaurant – Café Bastille
 Best Casual or Café-style Restaurant – Pegasus Bay Winery Restaurant
 Best Service – Soul Bar and Bistro
 Best Wine Service – Logan Brown Restaurant

Cuisine Artisan Awards
In September 2008 Cuisine started the Cuisine Artisan Awards.

The awards are open to small-scale producers of foodstuffs other than Cheese, Wine, Olive Oil, Beer and Coffee.  Entrants must have been in business for 12-month so that there is proven commercial success.

2011 Supreme Winner
  Havoc Pork – Yorkshire Black Bacon
2011 Runners-up
  Heilala Vanilla – Vanilla Paste
2011 Finalists
  The Damson Collection – Damson Jam
  Salumeria Fontana – Toulouse Sausage
  Akaroa Salmon – Hot-Smoked Salmon
  J Friend & Co – Beechwood Honeydew Honey
  Addmore – Elderflower Rosé
  Ludbrook House – Pickled Limes
  Clearwater's Organic Dairy – Cream Top Yoghurt with a Touch of Clover Honey
  Orcona Chillies – Harissa Paste
  Dollop Puddings – Vanilla Bean Custard
  Piako Gourmet Yoghurt – Frozen Yoghurt Lime Zest
Close favourites
  Annabelle Guinness's Love Fudge
  Aromatics Magical Mushroom Essence
  Fire Dragon chilli sauces
  Marama Organic Farm sheep sausages

2010 Supreme Winner
  Clevedon Valley Buffalo Yoghurt
2010 Runners-up
 Elderflower Cordial – Addmore Products
 New Zealand Artisan Wild Thyme Honey – J Friend and Co
2010 Finalists
 Mandys Horseradish – Horseradish New Zealand
 Unsalted Cultured Butter – Karikaas Natural Dairy Products
 Golden Syrup Ice-Cream – Kohu Road
 Fresh Chorizo – Mariano's Spanish Goods
 Pic's Really Good Peanut Butter – Picot Productions
 Proper Crisps – Proper Foods
 Ciabatta – Rachel Scott Bread
 Spiced Lavash – Ringawera Waiheke Island
 Damson Paste – The Damson Collection

2009 Supreme Winner
 Sicilian Sweet Fennel Sausages – Salumeria Fontana
2009 Runner-up
 Kina Pate – Apatu Aqua
2009 Finalists
 Roasted Cherry Chutney – Provisions
 Walnut Spread – Uncle Joe's
 Sesame Seed Lavash – Ringawera
 White Sourdough – The French Baker
 Wine Barrel Smoked Mushrooms – Aromatics
 Dessert Figs – Ludbrook House
 Elderflower Rhubarb Sparkle – Aroha
 Havelock Cheese – Sherrington Grange

Wither Hills wine controversy
In 2006, Wither Hills Sauvignon Blanc 2006 was stripped of its five-star rating by Cuisine after scientific tests by the Institute of Environmental Science and Research revealed that the wine submitted for review was not the same as that available in shops. The magazine's wine critic, Michael Cooper, said he was told that the magazine's publishers, Fairfax Media, would not be making public the reason for the reversal. He then went to The New Zealand Herald with the story, and his contract, which was to come to an end the following year, was terminated early.

See also
 List of food and drink magazines

References

External links
 Cuisine.co.nz

1986 establishments in New Zealand
Bi-monthly magazines
Food and drink magazines
Magazines established in 1986
Magazines published in New Zealand
New Zealand cuisine
Mass media in Auckland